Rafael Ángel Calderón may refer to:

Rafael Ángel Calderón Guardia, president of Costa Rica from 1940 to 1944
Rafael Ángel Calderón Fournier, president of Costa Rica from 1990 to 1994; son of the above